The Christ Child, also known as Divine Infant, Baby Jesus, Infant Jesus, the Divine Child, Child Jesus,  the Holy Child, Santo Niño, and to some as Señor Noemi refers to Jesus Christ from his nativity to age 12.

The four canonical gospels, accepted by most Christians today, lack any narration of the years between Jesus' infancy and the Finding in the Temple when he was 12.

Liturgical feasts

Liturgical feasts relating to Christ's infancy and childhood include:
 The Feast of the Nativity of Jesus Christ (25 December);
 The Feast of the Circumcision of Christ (1 January – Eastern Orthodox Church, Extraordinary Form of the Roman Rite);
 The Feast of the Holy Name of Jesus (3 January – Roman Rite; others – various);
 The Feast of the Epiphany (6 January or 19 January in the Gregorian equivalent of the Julian calendar)
 The Feast of the Presentation of the Lord (2 February)

Depictions in art

From about the third or fourth century onwards, the child Jesus is frequently shown in paintings, and sculpture. Commonly these are nativity scenes showing the birth of Jesus, with his mother Mary, and her husband Joseph.

Depictions as a baby with the Virgin Mary, known as Madonna and Child, are iconographical types in Eastern and Western traditions. Other scenes from his time as a baby, of his circumcision, presentation at the temple, the adoration of the Magi, and the flight into Egypt, are common.  Scenes showing his developing years are more rare but not unknown.

Saint Joseph, Anthony of Padua, and Saint Christopher are often depicted holding the Christ Child. The Christian mystics Saint Teresa of Ávila, Saint Thérèse of Lisieux, along with the devotees of Divino Niño such as Mother Angelica and Father Giovanni Rizzo claim to have had apparitions of Jesus as a toddler.

During the Middle Ages
The Christ Child was a popular subject in European wood sculpture beginning in the 1300s.

The Christ Child was well-known in Spain under the title montañesino after the santero sculptor Juan Martínez Montañés began the trend. These icons of the Christ Child were often posed in the contrapposto style in which the positioning of the knees reflected in the opposite direction, similar to ancient depictions of the Roman Emperor.

The images were quite popular among nobility of Spain and Portugal. Colonial images of the Christ child also began to wear vestments, a pious practice developed by the santero culture in later colonial years, carrying the depiction of holding the globus cruciger, a bird symbolizing a soul or the Holy Spirit, or various paraphernalia related to its locality or region.

The symbolism of the Child Jesus in art reached its apex during the Renaissance: the Holy Family was a central theme in the works of Leonardo da Vinci and many other masters.

Apocrypha
Some Biblical apocrypha contain the Infancy Gospels provide accounts of the birth and early life of Jesus. These are sometimes depicted. These stories were intended to show Jesus as having extraordinary gifts of power and knowledge, even from a young age. A common tale has the young Jesus animating sparrows out of clay belonging to his playmates. When admonished for doing so on the Sabbath, as in later life, he makes the birds fly away.

Devotional images

Several historically significant images of the Christ Child have been crowned by the pope, namely the Bambino Gesu of Arenzano and the Santo Bambino of Aracoeli (both in Italy), the Infant Jesus of Prague (Czech Republic), and the Santo Niño de Cebú (Philippines).

In the 17th century, French Carmelites promoted veneration of the "Little King of Beaune". In the late 19th century, a devotion to the “Holy Child of Remedy” developed in Madrid, Spain.

Music 

Tàladh Chrìosda ("Christ Child Lullaby") is a Scottish carol from Moidart, Scotland. The Catholic priest Father Ranald Rankin, wrote the lyrics for Midnight Mass around the year 1855.  He originally wrote 29 verses in Scottish Gaelic, but the popular English translation is limited to five. The melody, Cumha Mhic Arois (lament for Mac Àrois), is from the Hebrides and was a sung as a protective charm for the fisherman away at sea. The rhythm mirrors the rhythm of the surf. It is sung in the Hebrides at Midnight Mass on Christmas Eve.

Archconfraternity of the Holy Infancy
On 1636, a Carmelite nun, Marguerite of the Holy-Sacrament (Margaret Perigot) founded the Association of the Child Jesus in Beaune, France in honor of the divine infancy. Later, the Bishop of Autun canonically established the Confraternity of the Holy Infancy. On 1639 a chapel was built in the Carmel in Beaune, dedicated to the Infant Jesus. Gaston Jean Baptiste de Renty donated a statue which came to be referred to the "Little King of Grace". 

He then introduced Jean-Jacques Olier, founder of the Sulpicians, to Sister Marguerite. Olier then established the devotion to the Holy Infant at Saint-Sulpice, Paris. François Fénelon, who was then a priest at Saint-Sulpice, composed litanies of the Infant Jesus. Pope Alexander VII approved the Confraternity in January 1661; Pius IX made it an archconfraternity in 1855.

Christ Child Society
The Christ Child Society was founded in 1885 in Washington, D.C., by Mary Virginia Merrick, as a small relief organization to aid local underprivileged children. Additional chapters were started in other cities.

Gallery

See also
 Child Jesus images in Mexico
 Holy Infant of Good Health
 Infant Jesus of Mechelen -for a discussion of the style of sculpture
 Infant Jesus of Prague
 Santo Niño (disambiguation)
 Santo Niño de Atocha
 Maria Bambina -similar devotion to Mary

References

External links

Taladh Criosta

 
Christianity and children
Nativity of Jesus in the New Testament